Euphaedra athena, the Nigerian striped forester, is a butterfly in the family Nymphalidae. It is found in Nigeria. The habitat consists of dense forests.

Adults feed on fallen fruit.

Similar species
Other members of the Euphaedra zaddachii species group q.v.

References

Butterflies described in 2003
athena
Endemic fauna of Nigeria
Butterflies of Africa